This is a list of some of the most widely known commercially available perfumes from the fourteenth century onwards, sortable by year, name, company, perfumer, and the authority for its notability.

See also

 Perfume
 List of celebrity-branded fragrances

References

List
Fragrances
Fashion-related lists